The 2002–03 NBDL season was the second for the National Basketball Development League. The season ended with the Mobile Revelers defeating the Fayetteville Patriots 2 games to 1 to win their first and only NBDL Championship.

Regular season standings

Season award winners

League leaders
Cory Alexander: Roanoke Dazzle, Minutes Played (1794)
Nate Johnson: Columbus Riverdragons, Field Goals (354)
Nate Johnson: Columbus Riverdragons, Field Goal Attempts (759)
Peter Cornell: North Charleston Lowgators, Field Goal Pct. (.594)
Billy Thomas: Greenville Groove, 3-Pt Field Goals (84)
Billy Thomas: Greenville Groove, 3-Pt Field Goal Attempts (241)
Isaac Fontaine: Mobile Revelers, 3-Pt Field Goal Pct. (.442)
Nate Johnson: Columbus Riverdragons, Free Throws (225)
Terrence Shannon: Roanoke Dazzle, Free Throw Attempts (321)
Jason Capel: Fayetteville Patriots, Free Throw Pct. (.885)
Rodney Bias: Huntsville Flight, Offensive Rebounds (153)
Tang Hamilton: Columbus Riverdragons, Defensive Rebounds (310)
Tang Hamilton: Columbus Riverdragons, Total Rebounds (452)
Cory Alexander: Roanoke Dazzle, Assists (306)
Jeff Trepagnier: Asheville Altitude, Steals (111)
Jeff Aubry: Fayetteville Patriots, Blocks (70)
Cory Alexander: Roanoke Dazzle, Turnovers (198)
Jameel Watkins: Fayetteville Patriots, Personal Fouls (196)
Nate Johnson: Columbus Riverdragons, Points (955)
Cory Alexander: Roanoke Dazzle, Minutes per game (35.9)
Nate Johnson: Columbus Riverdragons, Points per game (19.5)
Tang Hamilton: Columbus Riverdragons, Rebounds per game (9.0)
Cory Alexander: Roanoke Dazzle, Assists per game (6.1)
Jeff Trepagnier: Asheville Altitude, Steals per game (2.3)
Karim Shabazz: North Charleston Lowgators, Blocks per game (1.8)

Playoffs
There were only 8 teams in the league. For the playoffs, the four teams with the best record in the league were seeded one to four. Each round of the playoffs were played a best-of-three series.

References